Ferenc Róth (born 24 December 1978) is a Hungarian football player. He currently plays for SV Zenting and previously for Viktoria Plzeň.

External links
 nemzetisport.hu Profile 
 footballplus.com Profile

1978 births
Living people
Hungarian footballers
Fehérvár FC players
Újpest FC players
1. FC Slovácko players
FC Viktoria Plzeň players

Association football midfielders